Hilario Ascasubi  is a town in the southwest corner Buenos Aires Province, Argentina, in the partido of Villarino Partido.   It is located on National Route 3 (Argentina).  The town is named after Argentine poet Hilario Ascasubi, and railroad service opened in the town in 1913.

The town is located approximately 70 km south of Médanos (the capital of Villarino Partido), and 106 km south of Bahía Blanca, the nearest major city.

Climate
Hilario Ascasubi  has borderline humid subtropical climate/semi-arid climate (Köppen climate classification Cfa/BSk). with hot, summers and cooler, drier winters.

See also
Villarino Partido

References

Populated places in Buenos Aires Province